

Films based on plays by Aeschylus

Films based on Sophocles

Films based on Euripides

Films based on Aristophanes

See also
 Fiction set in ancient Rome
 Fiction set in ancient Greece
 List of films based on classical mythology
 List of films based on Germanic mythology
 List of films based on Slavic mythology
 List of films set in ancient Greece
 List of films set in ancient Rome
 List of films set in ancient Egypt

Greek drama
Ancient Greek theatre
Lists of works based on plays
Greek drama
Ancient Greece in art and culture
Films based on ancient Greek plays
Films